Kafr Malik is a Palestinian town in the Ramallah and al-Bireh Governorate, located 17 kilometers Northeast of Ramallah in the northern West Bank.  According to the Palestinian Central Bureau of Statistics (PCBS), the town had a population of 2,787 inhabitants in 2007.

Location
Kafr Malik is a Palestinian village in Ramallah Governorate, located 13.8km northeast of Ramallah. It is bordered by Al Mughayyir  to the east, Al Mughayyir and Khirbet abu Falah to the north, Al Mazra'a ash Sharqiya to the west, and by Deir Jarir  to the south.

History
About two km east of Kafr Malik, at 'Ain Samiya (grid: 1817/1550), is a Roman mill, and buildings, possibly dating to the  Crusader era.

Kafr Malik has been identified with the village Caphermelic of the Crusader period.

Ottoman  era
Kafr Malik  was incorporated into the Ottoman Empire in 1517 with all of Palestine, and in 1596 it appeared in the  tax registers as being in the nahiya of Al-Quds in the liwa of Al-Quds. It had a population of 21 household;   who were all Muslims. They paid a fixed tax-rate of 33,3 % on agricultural products, including wheat, barley,  olive trees,  vineyards, fruit trees,  goats and beehives, in addition to occasional revenues; a total of 7,750 akçe.

In 1838, ‘’Kefr Malik’’  was noted as a Muslim village  in the District of Beni Salim, east of Jerusalem.

In 1870, Victor Guérin found Kafr Malik to have 350 inhabitants, some thirty Catholics and fifteen "schismatic Greek"; the others were Muslim. In the courtyard of the medhafeh, or guesthouse, he was shown several beautiful stone plaques and three sections of columns and several capitals of the Doric form belonging to an old edifice long since destroyed.

An Ottoman village list of about 1870  counted a population of  416 Muslims in 77 houses, and 15 Christians in 6 houses. In total 432 persons in 83 houses, though  the population count included men, only. 

In 1882,  the PEF's Survey of Western Palestine described Kefr Malik as: "a  village of moderate size on high ground."

In 1896 the population of Kefr Malik was estimated to be about 870 persons.

British Mandate era
In the 1922 census of Palestine conducted  by the British Mandate authorities, the village, called Kufr Malek, had a population of 943, all  Muslims, increasing in the  1931 census to 972; 922 Muslims and 20 Christians, in 217 houses.

In the 1945 statistics the population was 1,100; 1,080 Muslims and 20 Christians,   while the total land area was 52,196 dunams, according to an official land and population survey. Of  this,  3,580  were allocated  for plantations and irrigable land, 10,984 for cereals, while 53 dunams were classified as built-up areas.

Jordanian era
In the wake of the 1948 Arab–Israeli War, and after the 1949 Armistice Agreements, Kafr Malik came under Jordanian rule.

The Jordanian census of 1961 found 1,346 inhabitants in Kafr Malik.

1967-present
Since the Six-Day War in 1967, Kafr Malik has been under  Israeli occupation.    

After  the 1995 accords, 12,7% of  Kafr Malik  land is defined as Area B land, while the remaining 87,3% is defined as Area C. Israel has confiscated land from Kafr Malik for the Israeli settlements of Kokhav HaShahar and Mitzpe Kramim.

Footnotes

Bibliography

External links
Welcome To Kafr Malik
Survey of Western Palestine, Map 14: IAA, Wikimedia commons 
Kafr Malik Village (fact sheet),   Applied Research Institute–Jerusalem (ARIJ)
 Kafr Malik Village profile, ARIJ
Kafr Malik, aerial photo, ARIJ
Locality Development Priorities and Needs in Kafr Malik Village, ARIJ

Villages in the West Bank
Ramallah and al-Bireh Governorate
Throne villages
Municipalities of the State of Palestine